This is a list of Acts of the Parliament of England for the years 1603–1641.

For Acts passed during the period 1707–1800 see List of Acts of the Parliament of Great Britain.  See also the List of Acts of the Parliament of Scotland, the List of Acts of the Parliament of Ireland to 1700, and the List of Acts of the Parliament of Ireland, 1701–1800.

For Acts passed from 1801 onwards see List of Acts of the Parliament of the United Kingdom.  For Acts of the devolved parliaments and assemblies in the United Kingdom, see the List of Acts of the Scottish Parliament, the List of Acts of the Northern Ireland Assembly, and the List of Acts and Measures of the National Assembly for Wales; see also the List of Acts of the Parliament of Northern Ireland.

For medieval statutes, etc. that are not considered to be Acts of Parliament, see the List of English statutes.

The number shown after each Act's title is its chapter number.  Acts are cited using this number, preceded by the year(s) of the reign during which the relevant parliamentary session was held; thus the Union with Ireland Act 1800 is cited as "39 & 40 Geo. 3 c. 67", meaning the 67th Act passed during the session that started in the 39th year of the reign of George III and which finished in the 40th year of that reign.  Note that the modern convention is to use Arabic numerals in citations (thus "41 Geo. 3" rather than "41 Geo. III"). Acts of the last session of the Parliament of Great Britain and the first session of the Parliament of the United Kingdom are both cited as "41 Geo. 3".

Acts passed by the Parliament of England did not have a short title; however, some of these Acts have subsequently been given a short title by Acts of the Parliament of the United Kingdom (such as the Short Titles Act 1896).

Acts passed by the Parliament of England were deemed to have come into effect on the first day of the session in which they were passed.  Because of this, the years given in the list below may in fact be the year before a particular Act was passed.

See also the List of Ordinances and Acts of the Parliament of England, 1642–1660 for Ordinances and Acts passed by the Long Parliament and other bodies without royal assent, and which were not considered to be valid legislation following the Restoration in 1660.

1603–1610

1603 (1 Jas. 1)

Note that this session was traditionally cited as 2 Jac. 1; it is listed in the "Chronological Table of the Statutes" as 1 Ja. 1

Public Acts

 Succession to the Crown Act 1603 c. 1
 Union of England and Scotland Act 1603 c. 2
 (Episcopal lands) c. 3
 Jesuits etc. Act 1603 c. 4
 An Act to prevent the overcharge of the People by Stewards of Courte Leets and Courte Barons (Court leet) c. 5
 (Labourers) c. 6
 (Vagabonds) c. 7
 Statute of Stabbing 1603 c. 8
 (Inns) c. 9
 (Officers of courts) c. 10
 Bigamy Act 1603 c. 11
 Witchcraft Act 1604 c. 12
 The Privilege of Parliament Act 1603 or the Parliamentary Privilege Act 1603 c. 13 (still in force)
 (Small debts, etc., London) c. 14
 (Bankrupts) c. 15
 (Thames watermen) c. 16
 (Hats) c. 17
 (Hops) c. 18
 (Spices) c. 19
 (Painting) c. 20
 (Act against brokers) c. 21
 (Leather) c. 22
 (Fisheries) c. 23
 (Sail cloth) c. 24
 (Continuance of Acts, etc.) c. 25
 (Exchequer) c. 26
 (Game) c. 27
 (Berwick-on-Tweed) c. 28
 (Increase of seamen (fish-days)) c. 29
 (Melcombe Regis and Radipole, Dorset (church)) c. 30
 (The plague) c. 31
 (Dover Haven dues) c. 32
 (Taxation) c. 33

Private Acts

Confirmation of Queen Anne's jointure. c. 1
Assignment of sums for paying the King's household expenses. c. 2
Restitution of the Earl of Southampton. c. 3
Restitution of the Earl of Essex's children. c. 4
Restitution of the Earl of Arundel's son. c. 5
Restitution in blood of the Duke of Norfolk's descendants. c. 6
Restitution of Lord Pagett's son. c. 7
Restitution in blood of Thomas Lucas. c. 8
Securing Simpson's debt and the safety of the Warden of the Fleet in Sir Thomas Shirley's Case. c. 9
Securing the debt of Simpson and others and the safety of the Warden of the Fleet in Sir Thomas Shirley's Case. c. 10
Naturalization of Duke of Lennox, Henry, Lord of Obigney, and their children. c. 11
Naturalization of the Countess of Nottingham. c. 12
Naturalization of the Earl of Marre and family. c. 13
Naturalization of Sir George Howme and family. c. 14
Confirmation of Sir George Howme's letters patent. c. 15
Naturalization of Sir Edward Bruce and confirmation of letters patent. c. 16
Naturalization of Sir Thomas Areskin and family. c. 17
Confirmation of letters patent to Earl of Nottingham, Earl of Suffolk, Sir John Leveson and Sir John Trevor, for use of Lady Cobham. c. 18
Naturalization of Dame Marie Aston and family. c. 19
Naturalization of Sir John Ramsey. c. 20
Naturalization of Sir James Hay. c. 21
Naturalization of John Gordon, Dean of Sarum, and family. c. 22
Naturalization of Sir John Kennedy. c. 23
Naturalization of Sir John Drummond. c. 24
Naturalization of Adam Newton. c. 25
Restitution in blood of Thomas Littleton, and family. c. 26
Naturalization of William, Anne and Barbara Browne. c. 27
Thomas Throckmorton's estate: enabling sale of lands for payment of debts. c. 28
Naturalization of Thomas Glover, Margaret Mordant, Francis Collymore, Alexander Daniell, Nicholas Gilpine and Marie Copcote. c. 29
Sir Thomas Rowse's estate: sale of lands for payment of debts. c. 30
Settlement of the late Sir George Rodney's estate. c. 31
Assurance of lands to the Dean and Canons of Windsor, and of a lease of the prebend of Bedwin (Wiltshire) to the Earl of Hertford. c. 32
Henry Jernegan's estate: sale of manors of Dages in Raveningham and Heringfleet alias St. Olav's (Norfolk and Suffolk) for payment of debts. c. 33
Mary Calthrop's jointure. c. 34
Relief of Thomas Lovell. c. 35
Edward Nevill's estate: explanation of the Act of 1601 [c. 4] [Edward Nevill and Sir Henry Nevill: disposal of copyhold lands held of the manors of Rotherfield (Sussex) and Alesley and Fylongley (Warwickshire)]. c. 36
John Tebold's estate: enabling him to sell parts for the preferment of his children and to make a jointure. c. 37
Naturalization of Katherine, Elizabeth, Susan, Hester and Marie Vincents. c. 38
Naturalization of Victor Chauntrell, Peter Martin, Mentia Van Ursell and Sabina, Edward and Peregrine Aldrich. c. 39

1605 (3 Jas. 1)

Note that this session was traditionally cited as 3 Jac. 1; it is listed in the "Chronological Table of the Statutes" as 3 Ja. 1

Public Acts

 Observance of 5th November Act 1605 c. 1
 (Attainder of Guy Fawkes and others) c. 2
 (Union of England and Scotland) c. 3
 Popish Recusants Act 1605 c. 4
 Presentation of Benefices Act 1605 c. 5
 (Foreign trade) c. 6
 (Attorneys) c. 7
 (Execution) c. 8
 (Skinners) c. 9
 (Conveyance of offenders to gaol) c. 10
 (Exportation) c. 11
 (Fish) c. 12
 (Stealing of deer, etc.) c. 13
 (London watercourses (Commissioners of Sewers)) c. 14
 (Small debts, London City) c. 15
 (Kerseys) c. 16
 (Welsh cottons) c. 17
 (New River) c. 18
 (Highways at Long Ditton) c. 19
 (The Thames) c. 20
 Theatre Regulation Act 1605 c. 21
 (Drury Lane paving) c. 22
 (Chepstow Bridge (maintenance, etc.)) c. 23
 (Upton-upon-Severn Bridge (maintenance, etc.)) c. 24
 (Taxation) c. 25
 (Taxation) c. 26
 (General pardon) c. 27

Private Acts

Assurance of ground to Earl of Salisbury for enlargement of Salisbury House, Strand. c. 1
Assurance of the Countess of Essex's jointure. c. 2
Corpus Christi College, Oxford. c. 3
Lord Windsor's estate: sale of lands for payment of debts and better performance of his will. c. 4
Establishing the possessions and inheritance of Edmond, late Lord Chandos. c. 5
Vesting in the Crown the estates of Lord Cobham and George Brooke, attainted of high treason, with a confirmation of grants made by the King. c. 6
Confirmation of leases by Lord Spencer and his parents. c. 7
Restoration of Lord Danvers as heir to Sir John Danvers notwithstanding the attainder of his brother, Sir Charles Danvers. c. 8
Oriel College, Oxford, confirmation of letters patent. c. 9
St. Bees' Grammar School (Cumberland): confirmation of letters patent. c. 10
Sir Christopher Hatton's estate: enabling sale of property. c. 11
Sale of lands in Middlesex to Sir Thomas Lake and Dame Mary Knight his wife. c. 12
Sir Jonathan Trelawney's estate: sale of lands for payment of debts. c. 13
Assurance of Dame Elinor Cave's jointure. c. 14
John Hotham senior and John Hotham junior's estate: enabling them to convey lands to provide a jointure for John Hotham junior's future wife. c. 15
Settlement of manor of Rie (Gloucestershire and Worcestershire) on William Throckmorton. c. 16
Sir Thomas Rous' estate: sale of lands for payment of debts. c. 17
Sir John Skynner's estate: assurance of lands to Sir William Smith and Sir Michael Hicks. c. 18
John Roger's relief for a breach of trust made by Robert, Paul and William Taylor. c. 19
Assurance of lands of Walter Walshe. c. 20
Edward Downes' estate : sale of lands for payment of debts. c. 21
Naturalization of Sir Daniel Foulis and confirmation of letters patent. c. 22
Naturalization of Sir Edward Conway's children. c. 23
Naturalization of Sir James Areskyn and family. c. 24
Naturalization of Sir David Murray and Thomas Murray. c. 25
Naturalization of Daniel Godfrey. c. 26
Restitution in blood of John and Thomas Holland. c. 27
Restitution in blood of Roland Meyrick and Dame Margaret Knight. c. 28
Execution of Chancery decree between William le Gris and Robert Cottrell. c. 29

1606 (4 Jas. 1)

Note that this session was traditionally cited as 4 Jac. 1; it is listed in the "Chronological Table of the Statutes" as 4 Ja. 1

Public Acts

 (Union of England and Scotland) c. 1
 (Woollen cloths) c. 2
 (Costs) c. 3
 (Sale of beer) c. 4
 (Drunkenness) c. 5
 (Leather) c. 6
 (Northleech Grammar School, Gloucestershire) c. 7
 (Land drainage (Kent Marshes, Lessness and Fantes)) c. 8
 (Explanation of 3 Jas. 1 c. 6) c. 9
 (Charter of Southampton) c. 10
 (Land inclosure, Herefordshire) c. 11
 (New River channel) c. 12
 (Land drainage (Waldersey Ring and Coldham)) c. 13

Private Acts

Assurance of a life interest in Theobalds House and other manors and lands to the Queen, of the same properties and other manors and lands to the King and of other manors and lands to the Earl of Salisbury. c. 1
John Good's estate: enabling him to convey a small piece of land to the King for a term of years. c. 2
Earl of Derby's estate: establishment and assurance of possessions and hereditaments. c. 3
Enabling Richard Sackville to surrender the office of Chief Butler to the King despite his minority. c. 4
Assurance of advowson of Cheshunt [Hertfordshire] to the Earl of Salisbury and of Orsett [Essex] to the Bishop of London. c. 5
William Ibgrave's estate: confirmation of an agreement between Lord Bruce and Michael Doyley and others. c. 6
Confirmation of letters patent to Robert Bathurst of the manor and borough of Lechlade (Gloucestershire). c. 7
Confirmation of letters patent to William Bourcher of the manor of Bardisley (Gloucestershire). c. 8
Confirmation of lands to All Souls' College, Oxford, and to Sir William Smith. c. 9
Confirmation of lands etc. to City of London companies and to the City. c. 10
Assurance to purchasers of lands, late the estate of Sir Jonathan Trelawney, directed to be sold for payment of debts. c. 11
Restitution in blood of Edward Windsor's children. c. 12
John Evelyn's estate: sale of lands for payment of debts. c. 13
Maintenance of John Tompson (the son of a lunatic), and assignment of a jointure for his future wife. c. 14
William Waller's estate: sale of lands for payment of a debt of £505 10s 6d. c. 15
Naturalization of John Steward. c. 16
Naturalization of Peter and Mary Baron or Baro. c. 17
Naturalization of James and Mary Desmaistres. c. 18
Naturalization of Fabian Smith. c. 19
Naturalization of John Ramsden. c. 20

1609 (7 Jas. 1)

Note that this session was traditionally cited as 7 Jac. 1; it is listed in the "Chronological Table of the Statutes" as 7 Ja. 1

Public Acts

 (Criminal law) c. 1
 (Naturalization and restoration of blood) c. 2
 (Apprentice) c. 3
 (Vagabonds) c. 4
 (Public officers protection) c. 5
 Oath of Allegiance, etc. Act 1609 c. 6
 (Wool sorters, etc.) c. 7
 (Cattle) c. 8
 (London water (Hackney)) c. 9
 (Alehouse) c. 10
 (Game) c. 11
 Shop-books Evidence Act 1609 c. 12
 (Deer stealing) c. 13
 (Horns) c. 14
 Crown Debts Act 1609 c. 15
 (Cloths) c. 16
 (Burning of moor) c. 17
 (Devon and Cornwall sea-shore) c. 18
 (River Exe, weir) c. 19
 (Inundations, Norfolk and Suffolk) c. 20
 (Confirmation of decrees as to copyholds, etc.) c. 21
 (Taxation) c. 22
 (Taxation) c. 23
 (General pardon) c. 24

Private Acts

Manor of Wakefield (Yorkshire): confirmation of decrees between King and copyholders. c. 1
Manor of Edmonton (Middlesex): confirmation of a decree between King and copyholders. c. 2
Manors or Lordships of Clitheroe, Derby, Accrington, Colne and Ightenhill (Lancashire): creation and confirmation of copyholds. c. 3
Assurance of the Isle of Man Act 1609 c. 4
Earl of Derby's estate: explanation of the Act of 1606 [c. 3] [establishment and assurance of possessions and hereditaments]. c. 5
Assurance of lands to Bishop of Durham and Earl of Salisbury. c. 6
Naturalization of Sir Robert Karr. c. 7
Naturalization of Jane Drummond. c. 8
Earl of Oxenford's estate: sale of manor of Bretts and farm of Plaistow (Essex) towards repurchasing the castle, manor and parks of Henningham (Essex). c. 9
Assurance of farm and demesnes of Damerham (Wiltshire) according to the grants of the King and King Edward VI. c. 10
Foundation of hospital and grammar school, and maintenance of a teacher, in Thetford. c. 11
Naturalization of John Murray, Richard Murray, John Levingston and John Auchmothy. c. 12
Naturalization of Levinus Munk. c. 13
William and Edward Elringtons' orphans' provision: confirming and executing the Chancery decree against Edward Cage, executor of Rowland Elrington. c. 14
Naturalization of Robert Browne. c. 15
Confirmation of fines levied by John Arundell of Guarnack to John Arundell of Trerise, deceased, and settlement of the property comprised in the fines to John Arundell, son of John Arundell of Trerise. c. 16
Estates of Lord Abergavenny and Sir Henry Nevill: alienation of lands for payment of debts and advancement of children, and assurance of other lands lately purchased from the King. c. 17
Restitution in blood of George Brooke's children. c. 18
Disuniting the parsonages of Ashe and Deane (Hampshire). c. 19
Naturalization of Henry Gibb. c. 20
William Essex's estate: sale of lands for payment of debts, and settlement of residue. c. 21
Relief of John Holdich, disinherited by the extraordinary amending of the errors of a fine. c. 22
Naturalization of Sir George Ramsay, Walter Alexander and John Sandilandis. c. 23
Naturalization of Peter Vanloore. c. 24
Confirmation of the estate of the Company of Salters and Brewers of London. c. 25
Uniting parishes of Froome Whitfield (Dorset) and Holy Trinity, Dorchester. c. 26
Repair of river Exe weir near city of Exeter. c. 27
Establishment of Thomas Sutton's charities. c. 28
Establishing the inheritance of Sir Henry Crisp and rendering certain conveyances void. c. 29
Sir John Wentworth's estate: assurance of lands to provide portions, confirmation of life estates in other lands and enabling the sale of other lands for payment of debts. c. 30
Reginald Rous's estate: sale of lands in Badingham, Tymington and Little Glemham (Suffolk), to his nephew, Reginald Rous of the Inner Temple. c. 31
Naturalization of Edward and Henry Palmers and Michael Boyle. c. 32
Charles Waldegrave's estate: sale of lands for payment of debts and advancement of children. c. 33
Naturalization of Richard, John and Robert Bladwell, George and John Hasden, Elizabeth and Ann Cradock, Jane or Janekin Carstens and Elizabeth Van Buechton. c. 34
Confirmation of sales of property, late the estate of Henry Jarnegan, made by Sir Thomas Hirne, Christopher Hirne and Clement Hirne to Sir John and Dame Bridget Heveningham. c. 35
Naturalization of John Mounsy. c. 36
Naturalization of Joane Greensmith. c. 37
Revocation of Sir Robert Drury's conveyances. c. 38
Naturalization of Margaret Clark. c. 39
Sir John Biron's estate. c. 40
Naturalization of George Montgomery, Bishop of Derry, Sir Hugh Montgomery, Hugh and James Montgomery and Sir James Fullarton. c. 41
Naturalization of Martinus Schonerus, Dorothee and Engella Seelken, Katherine Benneken, John Wolfgang Rumbler and Anna de Lobell alias Wolfgang Rumbler. c. 42
Christopher and Millicent Smith: confirmation of deed of revocation. c. 43

1611–1620

1620 (18 & 19 Jas. 1)

Note that this session is not listed in the "Chronological Table of the Statutes"; the titles of the Acts are printed in "The Statutes of the Realm", Vol. IV, Part II; the Record Commissioners were unable to find any surviving copy of the text of either Act

Public Acts

 An Act for the Grant of Two entire Subsidies, granted by the Temporalty c. 1
 An Act for Confirmation of the Subsidies granted by the Clergy c. 2

1621–1630

1623 (21 Jas. 1)

Note that this session was traditionally cited as 21 Jac. 1; it is listed in the "Chronological Table of the Statutes" as 21 Ja. 1

Public Acts

 (Hospitals) c. 1
 (Crown suits, etc.) c. 2
 Statute of Monopolies 1624 c. 3
 Common Informers Act 1623 c. 4
 (Sheriffs) c. 5
 (Female convicts) c. 6
 (Drunkenness) c. 7
 (Certiorari abuses) c. 8
 (Welsh cloths) c. 9
 (Amendment of 34 & 35 Hen. 8. c. 26) c. 10
 (Heron's fish-curing patent void) c. 11
 (Public officers protection) c. 12
 (Jeofails) c. 13
 Intrusions Act 1623 c. 14
 Forcible Entry Act 1623 c. 15
 Limitation Act 1623 c. 16
 Usury Act 1623 c. 17
 (Woollen cloths) c. 18
 (Bankrupts) c. 19
 (Profane swearing) c. 20
 (Horsebread) c. 21
 (Butter and cheese) c. 22
 (Inferior courts) c. 23
 (Execution) c. 24
 Crown Lands Act 1623 c. 25 (still in force)
 (Fines and recoveries) c. 26
 (Concealment of birth of bastards) c. 27
 (Continuance of Acts, etc.) c. 28
 (Duchy of Cornwall) c. 29
 (Exchange of lands, King and Archbishop of York) c. 30
 (Hallamshire Cutlers) c. 31
 (Thames navigation) c. 32
 (Taxation) c. 33
 (Taxation) c. 34
 (General pardon) c. 35

Private Acts

Confirmation of Wadham College, Oxford, and its possessions. c. 1
Naturalization of Philip Burlemacchi. c. 2
Naturalization of Giles Vandeputt. c. 3
Earl of Hertford and Sir Francis Seymour: sale of lands for payment of debts, and establishment of others in lieu and of better value. c. 4
Naturalization of Sir Robert Anstrother, Sir George Abercromy and John Cragge. c. 5
Manors of Stepney and Hackney, confirmation of copyholders' rights. c. 6
Confirmation of sale of lands by Sir Thomas and Dame Elizabeth Beamond to Sir Thomas Checke. c. 7
Erection of free school, almshouses and house of correction in Lincolnshire. c. 8
Martin Calthrope's estate: sale of lands for preferment of children and payment of debts. c. 9
Assurance of manor of Goodneston and other lands of Sir Edward Engham. c. 10
Naturalization of Elizabeth and Mary Vere. c. 11
Alice Dudley's estate: enabling her to assure her estate in manor of Killingworth and other lands in Warwickshire to the Prince. c. 12
Confirmation of exchange of lands between Prince Charles and Sir Lewis Watson. c. 13
Viscount Montagu's estate: payment of debts and raising daughters' portions. c. 14
Sir Richard Lumley's estate: sale of lands for payment of debts and preferment of children. c. 15
Manor of Painswick (Gloucestershire): confirmation of Chancery decree between lord of the manor and customary tenants. c. 16
Naturalization of Sir Francis Stewart, Walter Maxwell, William Carr and James Levingston. c. 17
Naturalization of John Young. c. 18
Conveyance of manor of Little Munden (Hertfordshire) by Sir Peter Vanlore and Sir Charles and Dame Anne Cesar to Edmund Woodhall. c. 19
Naturalization of Jane Murrey and William Murrey. c. 20
Vincent Lowe's estate (Derbyshire): sale of lands for payment of debts. c. 21
Toby Pallavicine's estate: sale of lands for payment of debts and preferment of family. c. 22
Naturalization of Sir Robert Carre. c. 23
Assurance of manors of Newlangport and Sevans or Sephans and other lands in Kent, late the inheritance of Sir Henry James, convicted in a praemunire, to Martin Lumley, Alice Woodroffe and Edward Cropley. c. 24
Naturalization of Stephen Leisure. c. 25
Naturalization of the Marquis of Hamilton. c. 26
Naturalization of Sir William Anstrother, Walter Bellcanquall and Patrick Abercromy. c. 27
Sir Edward Heron's estate: confirmation of sale of lands to Bevell Molesworth, enabling sale of others for payment of debts and settlement of others upon Robert and Edward Heron in lieu. c. 28
Naturalization of Abigail and William Little. c. 29
Establishment of manors and lands in Cornwall, Devon and Dorset on John Mohun. c. 30
Edward Alcocke's estate: enabling the sale of the manor of Rampton, and lands in Rampton, Wivelingham and Cottenham (Cambridgeshire). c. 31
Estates of Bishop of Coventry and Lichfield, and Fisher: explanation of the Act of 1580 [c. 5] [assurance of a rent of £82 10s. to the Bishop of Coventry and Lichfield]. c. 32
Establishment of Thomas Whetenhall's lectures in divinity. c. 33
Colchester: repair and maintenance of the haven river and channel, and provision of paving. c. 34
Sir Francis Clerke's estate: sale of lands for payment of debts and provision of portions for children. c. 35
Alteration of tenure and custom of lands formerly of Thomas Potter and of Sir George and Sir John Rivers in Kent from gavelkind to the common law, and to settle them on Sir John Rivers and his heirs. c. 36
Earl of Middlesex's estate: subjecting lands to the payment of debts. c. 37
Sale of manor of Abbotts Hall (Essex) for payment of Sir James Pointz's creditors. c. 38

1625 (1 Chas. 1)

Note that this session was traditionally cited as 1 Car. 1; it is listed in the "Chronological Table of the Statutes" as 1 Cha. 1

Public Acts

 Sunday Observance Act 1625 c. 1
 (Duchy of Cornwall) c. 2
 (Licences of alienation) c. 3
 (Alehouses) c. 4
 (Taxation) c. 5
 (Taxation) c. 6
 (Parliament) c. 7

Private Acts

Manors of Cheltenham and Asheley or Charlton Kings (Gloucestershire): confirmation of copyhold estates and customs according to an agreement between the King (then Prince of Wales, Duke of Cornwall and of York and Earl of Chester), lord of the manor of Cheltenham, Giles Greville lord of the manor of Asheley and the copyholders of the manors. c. 1
Manor of Macclesfield (Cheshire): confirmation of an agreement between the Commissioners of Revenue on behalf of His Majesty (then Prince of Wales, Duke of Cornwall and Earl of Chester) and the copyholders of the manor, and of an Exchequer decree for making a parcel of the manor copyhold. c. 2

1627 (3 Chas. 1)

Note that this session was traditionally cited as 3 Car. 1; it is listed in the "Chronological Table of the Statutes" as 3 Cha. 1

Public Acts

 Petition of Right c. 1 (still in force)
 Sunday Observance Act 1627 c. 2
 Popery Act 1627 c. 3
 (Alehouse) c. 4
 (Continuance of Acts, etc.) c. 5
 (Lands at Bromfield and Yale, Denbighshire) c. 6
 (Taxation) c. 7
 (Taxation) c. 8

Private Acts

Foundation of Sutton's Hospital in Charterhouse. c. 1
Sir Thomas Neville's estate: assurance of jointure to Frances Nevill and sale of lands by him and Lord Abergavenny for payment of debts and preferment of children. c. 2
Earl of Devon's estate. c. 3
Earl of Arundel's title, name, dignity and estate. c. 4
Lord Gerrard's estate : provision of jointure for any future wife, provision for younger children and securing maintenance for his sisters Alice, Frances and Elizabeth. c. 5
Confirmation of Earl of Bristol's letters patent. c. 6
William Morgan's estate: discharging the trust concerning property in Somerset. c. 7
Naturalization of Sir Robert Dyell and George Kerke. c. 8
Naturalization of Sir Daniel Deligne. c. 9
Naturalization of Isaac, Henry, Thomas and Bernard Asteley. c. 10
Naturalization of Sir Robert Ayton. c. 11
Naturalization of Samuel Powell. c. 12
Vincent Lowe's estate: amendment of the Act of 1623 [c. 21] [sale of land for payment of debts]. c. 13
Naturalization of Alexander Levingston. c. 14
Naturalization of James Freese. c. 15
Restitution in blood of Carew Raleigh, son of Sir Walter Raleigh, and confirmation of Earl of Bristol's letters patent. c. 16
Naturalization of John, Mary, Ann, Elizabeth and Margaret Aldersey. c. 17
Confirmation of estates of customary tenants of Henry, Baron of Rye, in the manor of Horneby and elsewhere in the townships of Tatham, Gressingham and Eskrigg (Lancashire). c. 18
Naturalization of John and Anne Trumball, William, Edward and Sidney Bere and Samuel Wentworth. c. 19

1631–1640

1640 (16 Chas. 1)

Notes:
This session was traditionally cited as 16 Car. 1; it is listed in the "Chronological Table of the Statutes" as 16 Cha. 1
Private Act c. 1 is printed as Public Act c. 38 in "The Statutes of the Realm"; it is also listed in the "Chronological Table of the Statutes" as c. 38
Acts in this session were passed between 1641 and 1642

Public Acts

 (Parliament) c. 1 – commonly known as the Triennial Act 1641
 (Taxation) c. 2
 (Taxation) c. 3
 (Taxation) c. 4
 (Impressment of seamen) c. 5
 (Michaelmas term) c. 6
 (Parliament) c. 7 - Act against Dissolving the Long Parliament without its own Consent (May 10, 1641) wikisource
 (Taxation) c. 8
 (Taxation) c. 9
 Habeas Corpus Act 1640 c. 10
 Abolition of High Commission Court Act 1640 c. 11
 (Taxation) c. 12
 (Payment for billets) c. 13
 Ship Money Act 1640 c. 14
 (Stannaries Court) c. 15
 Delimitation of Forests Act 1640 c. 16
 Pacification, England and Scotland Act 1640 c. 17
 (Payment to Scotland) c. 18
 (Clerk of the market, etc.) c. 19
 (Knighthood) c. 20
 (Gunpowder) c. 21
 (Subsidy) c. 22
 (Impressment of seamen) c. 23
 (Suppression of piracy) c. 24
 (Taxation) c. 25
 (Impressment of seamen) c. 26
 Clergy Act 1640 c. 27
 (Impressment of soldiers) c. 28
 (Subsidy) c. 29
 Relief of Ireland Act 1640 c. 30
 (Taxation) c. 31
 (Taxation) c. 32
 (Lands of Irish rebels; adventurers' subscriptions) c. 33 – commonly known as the "Adventurers' Act"
 (Lands of Irish rebels; adventurers' subscriptions) c. 34 – defined times of payment, etc. for the Adventurers' Act
 (Lands of Irish rebels; adventurers' subscriptions) c. 35 – enabled corporate bodies to be adventurers in Ireland
 (Taxation) c. 36
 (Irish rebels) c. 37

Private Acts

Earl of Strafford's attainder. c. 1
Marquis of Winchester's estate: enabling grant of leases of three lives or 21 years of lands in Hampshire. c. 2
Naturalization of Dorothy Spencer. c. 3
Earl of Winchelsea's estate: sale and leasing of lands for payment of debts. c. 4
Estate of Elizabeth, Dowager Countess of Exeter: vesting in her the site of St. Leonard's Hospital, Newark-upon-Trent (Nottinghamshire) and vesting other property in the hospital in lieu. c. 5
Hoole Chapel (Lancashire): making it a parish church. c. 6
John Eggar's Free School, Alton (Hampshire). c. 7
Settling property on Katherine, Dowager Countess of Bedford, William, Earl of Bedford, John Russell and Edward Russell. c. 8
Confirmation of letters patent to Plymouth, division of the parish and erection of a new church. c. 9
Bishop of London's estate: alteration of the tenure of lands held of the manor of Fulham. c. 10
Settlement of manor of Belgrave and other lands (Leicestershire) on William Byerly towards payment of debts of William Davenport deceased. c. 11
Sir Alexander Denton's estate: power to sell manor of Barford St Michael (Oxfordshire) for payment of debts and preferment of children. c. 12
Bishop of Durham's estate: assurance of Durham House, St Martin in-the-Fields to Philip, Earl of Pembroke, and a yearly rent of £200 to the Bishop of Durham and his successors in lieu. c. 13

See also
List of Acts of the Parliament of England

References
 John Raithby (ed. 1819) Statutes of the Realm: volume 5 - 1628-80,  website British History Online, Sponsor History of Parliament Trust, accessed 19 February 2008. Description: "The statutes that passed into law under Charles I and Charles II, including the legislation of the Long and Short Parliaments before the Interregnum, and of the Restoration after."
 The Statutes at Large - Volume 7 - 39 Elizabeth to 12 Charles II - 1597-8 to 1660

 
1603
17th century in England